is a Japanese professional baseball shortstop for the Chiba Lotte Marines in Japan's Nippon Professional Baseball.

External links

1989 births
Living people
Baseball people from Saga Prefecture
Japanese baseball players
Nippon Professional Baseball infielders
Hanshin Tigers players
Chiba Lotte Marines players